Keep Up may refer to:

Keep Up (EP), a 2016 EP by KSI
"Keep Up" (KSI song), a 2015 song by KSI
"Keep Up" (Heavy Stereo song), a 1996 song by Heavy Stereo
"Keep Up" (Hyper Crush song), a 2009 song by Hyper Crush